Newtown (formerly, Sailor Flat, Newton and Sailors Flat) is an unincorporated community in Nevada County, California. It lies at an elevation of 2113 feet (644 m).

Sailors discovered gold there, whence the name Sailors Flat.

References

Unincorporated communities in California
Unincorporated communities in Nevada County, California